Lee Nelson's Well Funny People is  a British television comedy series starring Simon Brodkin produced by  Avalon for BBC Three.

Episode list

References

External links

2010s British comedy television series
2013 British television series debuts
2013 British television series endings
BBC television sketch shows
Television series by ITV Studios
English-language television shows